St. Marys is a city in Auglaize County, Ohio, United States. The city is located on a portage between the St. Marys and Auglaize river systems, which was a significant factor in its development before the era of canals. The population was 8,332 at the 2010 census. It is included in the Wapakoneta, Ohio, Micropolitan Statistical Area. It was founded in 1823 and takes its name from the nearby St. Marys River.

History
After the Revolutionary War, the Shawnee village on the site became known as Girty's Town for the Indian traders James and Simon Girty, who had a trading post on the site. James Girty was originally a partner of Peter Loramie, but fled to the St. Marys River when Loramie's trading post was burned in 1782. Girty maintained his trading post between 1783 and 1790 and fled when General Harmar's army approached. He later returned to the post.  When General Anthony Wayne approached the St. Marys area in 1794, James Girty packed up his goods and fled to Canada, thus ending the Girty Brothers era in Ohio. The village retained the name until the modern town was founded in 1823.

When General Wayne returned through the St. Marys area late in 1794 after the Battle of Fallen Timbers, he found the site deserted but noted its strategic location as a portage between the St. Mary's River and Auglaize River.  He ordered a fort built on the location.  Fort St. Mary's, named for the nearby river, was built by a detachment under Lieutenant John Michael in Oct. 1795 following the Treaty of Greenville.  Lieutenant John Whistler was placed in charge of the garrison.

In 1812, Gen. William Henry Harrison found the fort in ruins, and built a fort named Fort Barbee on an adjacent site.  Col. Joshua Barbee was placed in charge of the fort.

The latter treaty secured about a third of the state of Indiana from the Miami and Delaware Indians for the United States. The fort was abandoned shortly afterward.

The earliest settlers arrived in 1820. St. Marys was founded by William Houston and John McCorkle, and Charles Murray, in 1823. They bought  of land and laid out the village of 68 lots. The village was incorporated as a town in 1834 and Judge Stacy Taylor was elected its first mayor.  The town surpassed the threshold of 5,000 persons and became a city in 1904.

St. Marys was the county seat of Mercer County from 1824 until 1840 when the seat was moved to Celina. After Auglaize County was organized in 1848, St. Marys competed with Wapakoneta for the position as county seat but was ultimately unsuccessful in a controversial countywide election.

Three properties in St. Marys are listed on the National Register of Historic Places: the former Fountain Hotel, the Dr. Issac Elmer Williams House and Office, and the former Holy Rosary Catholic Church, which was destroyed one year before it was placed on the Register.

St. Marys is a part of the Tree City USA national program.

Geography
St Marys is located at  (40.544256, -84.390060).

Education
Saint Marys is home to Memorial High School.

Demographics

2010 census
As of the census of 2010, there were 8,332 people, 3,283 households, and 2,194 families residing in the city. The racial makeup of the city was 96.7% White, 0.4% African American, 0.1% Native American, 0.7% Asian, 0.1% Pacific Islander, 0.4% from other races, and 1.5% from two or more races. Hispanic or Latino of any race were 1.3% of the population.

There were 3,283 households, of which 33.9% had children under the age of 18 living with them, 49.7% were married couples living together, 11.5% had a female householder with no husband present, 5.6% had a male householder with no wife present, and 33.2% were non-families. 28.9% of all households were made up of individuals, and 12.6% had someone living alone who was 65 years of age or older. The average household size was 2.51 and the average family size was 3.08.

The median age in the city was 37.5 years. 26.6% of residents were under the age of 18; 8.7% were between the ages of 18 and 24; 25% were from 25 to 44; 25.4% were from 45 to 64; and 14.4% were 65 years of age or older. The gender makeup of the city was 49.2% male and 50.8% female.

2000 census
As of the census of 2000, there were 8,342 people, 3,218 households, and 2,240 families residing in the city. The population density was 1,926.7 people per square mile (743.8/km). There were 3,479 housing units at an average density of 803.5 per square mile (310.2/km). The racial makeup of the city was 97.49% White, 0.35% African American, 0.13% Native American, 0.98% Asian, 0.02% Pacific Islander, 0.14% from other races, and 0.88% from two or more races. Hispanic or Latino of any race were 0.46% of the population.

There were 3,218 households, out of which 35.1% had children under the age of 18 living with them, 54.9% were married couples living together, 10.6% had a female householder with no husband present, and 30.4% were non-families. 26.9% of all households were made up of individuals, and 12.0% had someone living alone who was 65 years of age or older. The average household size was 2.55 and the average family size was 3.10.

In the city the population was spread out, with 28.3% under the age of 18, 7.9% from 18 to 24, 28.5% from 25 to 44, 20.3% from 45 to 64, and 14.9% who were 65 years of age or older. The median age was 35 years. For every 100 females, there were 94.2 males. For every 100 females age 18 and over, there were 88.5 males.

The median income for a household in the city was $38,673, and the median income for a family was $44,247. Males had a median income of $38,371 versus $22,080 for females. The per capita income for the city was $17,682. About 5.7% of families and 7.3% of the population were below the poverty line, including 9.8% of those under age 18 and 4.9% of those age 65 or over.

Sister cities

St. Marys' neighboring municipalities, Wapakoneta and New Knoxville, are sister cities with Lienen's neighbors, Lengerich and Ladbergen, respectively.

Notable people

 Galen Cisco, MLB player and coach
 Albert P. Halfhill, father of the tuna packing industry, attended school here.
 William K. Howard, film director
 Jim Tully, author
 Robert Vogel, professional marksman and competition shooter
 Chuck Weyant, racecar driver
 Johann August Ernst von Willich, Prussian military officer, early proponent of communism in Germany, general in Union Army during the American Civil War
Barbara Poppe, served in Obama Administration 2009-2014 as head of the United States Interagency Council on Homelessness

Gallery

Notes

References

External links

City website

Cities in Auglaize County, Ohio
Populated places established in 1834
1834 establishments in Ohio
Cities in Ohio